The Episcopal Conference of Panama is the union of all the bishops of Panama, which in turn are the holders of each diocese.
The Episcopal Conference of Panama forms a single Ecclesiastical Province, which consists of:

An Archdiocese:
Roman Catholic Archdiocese of Panama

Five Dioceses:

Roman Catholic Diocese of Chitre
Roman Catholic Diocese of Santiago de Veraguas
Roman Catholic Diocese of David
Roman Catholic Diocese of Colón-Kuna Yala
Roman Catholic Diocese of Penonomé

An Apostolic Vicariate:
Apostolic Vicariate of Darien

A Prelature:
Roman Catholic Territorial Prelature of Bocas del Toro

See also
Catholic Church in Panama

References

External links
 http://www.iglesia.org.pa/nueva/

Panama
Catholic Church in Panama